The Rising Sun is an historic pub at 38 Cloth Fair in the City of London. It is the only City pub to have been closed then re-opened. John Betjeman was a customer when he lived in nearby Cloth Court.

References

Pubs in the City of London